Martalli is a village in the southern state of Karnataka, India. It is located in the Hanur taluk of Chamarajanagar district.

Demographics
 India census, Martalli had a population of 13182 with 6796 males and 6386 females.

See also
 Chamarajanagar
 Districts of Karnataka

 pin 571320

References

External links
 http://Chamarajanagar.nic.in/

Villages in Chamarajanagar district